Caripetella is a monotypic genus of East African nursery web spiders containing the single species, Caripetella madagascariensis. It was first described by Embrik Strand in 1928, and is only found on Comoros and on Madagascar.

See also
 List of Pisauridae species

References

Monotypic Araneomorphae genera
Pisauridae
Spiders of Africa
Spiders of Madagascar
Taxa named by Embrik Strand